The Superior Court of Justice of Nuevo León (Spanish: Tribunal Superior de Justicia de Nuevo León) is the judicial branch of government of Nuevo León.

Ministers of the Court are elected by the state congress from a list presented by the governor.

The Superior Court meets in Monterrey in the Superior Court of Justice Building.

Government of Nuevo León
Law of Mexico